The 2015 German Darts Championship was the first of nine PDC European Tour events on the 2015 PDC Pro Tour. The tournament took place at Halle 39, Hildesheim, Germany, between 13–15 February 2015. It featured a field of 48 players and £115,000 in prize money, with £25,000 going to the winner.

Gary Anderson was the defending champion, having beaten Justin Pipe 6–5 in the 2014 tournament´s final, and in this year's final Michael van Gerwen won the title by beating Anderson 6–2.

Prize money
The prize fund was increased to £115,000 after being £100,000 for the previous two years.

Qualification and format
The top 16 players from the PDC ProTour Order of Merit on the 16 January 2015 automatically qualified for the event. The remaining 32 places went to players from three qualifying events - 20 from the UK Qualifier (held in Wigan on 18 January), eight from the European Qualifier (held in Bielefeld on 24 January) and four from the Host Nation Qualifier (held at the venue the day before the event started).

The following players took part in the tournament:

Top 16
  Gary Anderson (runner-up)
  Michael van Gerwen (winner)
  Michael Smith (third round)
  Peter Wright (third round)
  James Wade (third round)
  Robert Thornton (quarter-finals)
  Brendan Dolan (third round)
  Mervyn King (third round)
  Justin Pipe (quarter-finals)
  Ian White (second round)
  Simon Whitlock (third round)
  Vincent van der Voort (quarter-finals)
  Adrian Lewis (semi-finals)
  Kim Huybrechts (second round)
  Stephen Bunting (third round)
  Steve Beaton (third round)

UK Qualifier 
  Terry Jenkins (second round)
  James Wilson (second round)
  John Bowles (second round)
  Chris Aubrey (first round)
  Jamie Caven (first round)
  Devon Petersen (first round)
  Stuart Kellett (second round)
  Andy Boulton (second round)
  John Scott (first round)
  Ricky Williams (second round)
  Andy Smith (second round)
  Kevin Thomas (first round)
  Joe Murnan (quarter-finals)
  Joe Cullen (first round)
  Pete Dyos (second round)
  Andy Parsons (second round)
  Kevin McDine (first round)
  John Part (first round)
  Ross Smith (second round)
  Michael Barnard (first round)

European Qualifier
  Jelle Klaasen (second round)
  Jeffrey de Zwaan (second round)
  Mareno Michels (first round)
  Ryan de Vreede (first round)
  Mensur Suljović (semi-finals)
  Ronny Huybrechts (second round)
  Benito van de Pas (first round)
  Cristo Reyes (first round)

Host Nation Qualifier
  Sascha Stein (first round)
  Maik Langendorf (second round)
  Bernd Roith (withdrew)
  Daniel Zygla (first round)

Draw

References

2015
2015 PDC European Tour
2015 in German sport
Sport in Hildesheim